There were nine special elections to the United States House of Representatives in 1899 during the 56th United States Congress, which began on March 4, 1899. None of the special elections in 1899 were during the 55th United States Congress, which ended March 3, 1899.

|-
| 
| Nelson Dingley Jr.
|  | Republican
| 1880
|  | Incumbent member-elect died January 13, 1899.New member elected June 19, 1899.Republican hold.Successor seated December 4, 1899 with the rest of the House.
| nowrap | 

|-
| 
| Samuel T. Baird
|  | Democratic
| 1896
|  | Incumbent died April 22, 1899.New member elected August 29, 1899.Democratic hold.Successor seated December 4, 1899 with the rest of the House.
| nowrap | 

|-
| 
| Richard P. Bland
|  | Democratic
| 18721894 1896
|  | Incumbent died June 15, 1899.New member elected August 29, 1899.Democratic hold.Successor seated December 4, 1899 with the rest of the House.
| nowrap | 

|-
| 
| Thomas B. Reed
|  | Republican
| 1876
|  | Incumbent resigned September 4, 1899 to protest the Spanish–American War.New member elected November 7, 1899.Republican hold.Successor seated December 4, 1899 with the rest of the House.
| nowrap | 

|-
| 
| William L. Greene
|  | Populist
| 1896
|  | Incumbent died March 11, 1899.New member elected November 7, 1899.Populist hold.Successor seated December 4, 1899 with the rest of the House.
| nowrap | 

|-
| 

| Warren B. Hooker
|  | Republican
| 1890
|  | Incumbent member-elect resigned November 10, 1898 to become a Justice of the Supreme Court of New York.New member elected November 7, 1899.Republican hold.Successor seated December 4, 1899 with the rest of the House.
| nowrap | 

|-
| 
| Lorenzo Danford
|  | Republican
| 18721878 1894
|  | Incumbent died June 19, 1899.New member elected November 7, 1899.Republican hold.Successor seated December 4, 1899 with the rest of the House.
| nowrap | 

|-
| 
| Daniel Ermentrout
|  | Democratic
| 18801878 1896
|  | Incumbent died September 17, 1899.New member elected November 7, 1899.Democratic hold.Successor seated December 4, 1899 with the rest of the House.
| nowrap | 

|-
| 
| Evan E. Settle
|  | Democratic
| 1896
|  | Incumbent died November 16, 1899.New member elected December 18, 1899.Democratic hold.Successor seated January 15, 1900.
| nowrap | 

|}

References 

 
1899